AIST, Aist, or variant, can refer to:

AIST
African Institute of Science and Technology
Nelson Mandela African Institute of Science and Technology
National Institute of Advanced Industrial Science and Technology, one of the biggest research institutions in Japan
Association for Iron and Steel Technology, the main group for ferrous metallurgists in the United States
AgInSbTe alloy used in rewritable CDs

Aist, Upper Austria
Aist (river), in Austria
Wartberg ob der Aist, a town on the river Aist
Aist parish (Gemeinde) in Naarn im Machlande on the river Aist
Dietmar von Aist, 12th century minnesinger from the region of the Aist river

Aist, Russian for "stork"
Aist Bicycles, Belarusian bicycle company
Aist-class LCAC, assault hovercraft operated by the Soviet and Russian Navy
Khrunichev T-411 Aist, Russian light utility monoplane
Aist 1, a small satellite
Aist, a Belorussian cruise missile

See also
 AISTS, the International Academy of Sport Science and Technology